The 2017 Torneo Internazionale Femminile Antico Tiro a Volo was a professional tennis tournament played on outdoor clay courts. It was the ninth edition of the tournament and was part of the 2017 ITF Women's Circuit. It took place in Rome, Italy, on 3–9 July 2017.

Singles main draw entrants

Seeds 

 1 Rankings as of 26 June 2017.

Other entrants 
The following player received a wildcard into the singles main draw:
  Nastassja Burnett
  Martina Di Giuseppe
  Nina Nikprelevic
  Jessica Pieri

The following players received entry from the qualifying draw:
  Martina Caregaro
  Deborah Chiesa
  Anastasia Grymalska
  Alice Matteucci

The following players received entry as lucky losers:
  Diāna Marcinkēviča
  Elena Gabriela Ruse

Champions

Singles

 Kateryna Kozlova def.  Mariana Duque, 7–6(8–6), 6–4

Doubles
 
 Anastasiya Komardina /  Nadia Podoroska def.  Quirine Lemoine /  Eva Wacanno, 7–6(7–3), 6–3

External links 
 2017 Torneo Internazionale Femminile Antico Tiro a Volo at ITFtennis.com
 Official website

2017 ITF Women's Circuit
2017 in Italian tennis
Tennis tournaments in Italy